The 2001 WNBA season was the third season for the Minnesota Lynx.

Offseason

WNBA Draft

Regular season

Season standings

Season schedule

Player stats

References

Minnesota Lynx seasons
Minnesota
Minnesota Lynx